Ibrahim Khan Lodi (or Lodhi) (1480 – 21 April 1526) was the last Sultan of the Delhi Sultanate, who became Sultan in 1517 after the death of his father Sikandar Khan Lodi. He was the last ruler of the Lodi dynasty, reigning for nine years until 1526, when he was defeated and killed at the Battle of Panipat by Babur's invading army, giving way to the emergence of the Mughal Empire in India.

Biography
Ibrahim was an ethnic Pashtun. He attained the throne upon the death of his father, Sikandar, but was not blessed with the same ruling capability. He faced a number of rebellions. Ibrahim Khan Lodi also displeased the nobility when he replaced old and senior commanders with younger ones who were loyal to him. His Afghan nobility eventually invited Babur to invade India.

In 1526, the Mughal forces of Babur, the king of Kabulistan (Kabul, present Afghanistan), defeated Ibrahim's much larger army in the Battle of Panipat. He was killed in the battle. It is estimated that Babur's forces numbered around 12,000–25,000 men and had between 20 and 24 pieces of canons. Ibrahim Khan Lodi had around 50,000 to 120,000 men along with around 400 to 1000 war elephants.
In the ensuing battle the Lodi forces were tarnished with over 20,000 killed and many more wounded and captured.
After the end of Lodi dynasty, the era of Mughal rule commenced for next 331 years.

Tomb

His tomb is often mistaken to be the Shisha Gumbad within Lodi Gardens, Delhi. Rather Ibrahim Khan Lodi's Tomb is actually situated near the tehsil office in Panipat, close to the Dargah of Sufi saint Bu Ali Shah Qalandar. It is a simple rectangular structure on a high platform approached by a flight of steps. In 1866, the British relocated the tomb during construction of the Grand Trunk Road and renovated it with an inscription highlighting Ibrahim Khan Lodi's death in the Battle of Panipat. He also built a Khwaja Khizr Tomb in Sonipat in 1522.

Jalal Khan Lodi's Revolt
In 1520, Ibrahim's eldest brother and heir to the throne, Jalal Khan Lodi, marched with an army from Jaunpur towards Delhi to take the throne. Hearing of Jalal Khan's revolt, Ibrahim Lodi imprisoned his brothers Ismail, Husein, Daulat and Mahmud at the fort of Hansi. He marched towards Awadh to meet his brother Jalal's army and after defeating the army, he forgave his brother and repositioned him as governor of Jaunpur and  Lakhnau (or Lucknow).

Gallery

See also 
Sher Shah Suri
Tomb of Ibrahim Lodi

References

External links 
Abundance and low prices during the reign of Sultan Ibrahim Lodi 
Lodī dynasty - Encyclopædia Britannica

	

1526 deaths
Ibrahim
Indian people of Pashtun descent
People from Panipat
People from Delhi
1517 in India
16th-century Indian monarchs
Year of birth unknown
16th-century Indian Muslims
1480 births